Cleburne County School District  is a school district in Cleburne County, Alabama, United States. The mission of the Cleburne County School System is to provide education of the highest quality, that motivates all students to excel, meets their individual needs, and prepares them for the future.

A survey report on the county's schools was published in 1932.

List of schools

Elementary schools
Cleburne County Elementary School
Fruithurst Elementary School
Pleasant Grove Elementary School
Ranburne Elementary School

Middle schools
Cleburne County Middle School

High schools
Cleburne County Career Technical School
Cleburne County High School
Ranburne High School

Ranburne High School
Ranburne High School is a public high school in Ranburne, Alabama serving students in Cleburne County, Alabama. It is part of the Cleburne County School District. The school has about 225 students. The school's teams compete as the Bulldogs and the school colors are purple and gray. Chase Whitley is an alumnus.

The school's football team was established in 1931. It went 0–5 in 1948 and did not score any points. In 1976 the team won the 1A state football championship.

The student body is mostly white.

See also
List of high schools in Alabama

References

External links
 

School districts in Alabama
1867 establishments in Alabama
School districts established in 1867